Doi Lan is a tambon (subdistrict) of Mueang Chiang Rai District, in Chiang Rai Province, Thailand. In 2005 it had a population of 10,854 people. The tambon contains 20 villages.

This subdistrict is named after nearby Doi Lan, a 559 m high karstic outcrop rising in one of the intermontane basins of the Phi Pan Nam Range.

References

Tambon of Chiang Rai province
Populated places in Chiang Rai province